The Gutierrez family is a Filipino family of entertainers.

List of members

 Eddie Gutierrez 
 with Pilita Corrales, had
 Ramon Christopher
 ∞ married Lotlot de Leon (annulled), they have four children: Diego, Janine, Maxine and Jessica. 
 Janine Gutierrez
 with Liza Lorena, had
 Tonton Gutierrez
 ∞ married Glydel Mercado, they have two daughters: Aneeka and Aneeza.
 Aneeza Gutierrez
 ∞ married Annabelle Rama, they have 6 children
 Ruffa Gutierrez
 ∞ married Yilmaz Bektas (divorced), have two daughters: Venice and Lorin.
 Richard Gutierrez 
 ∞ married Sarah Lahbati, they have two sons: Zion and Kai.
 Raymond Gutierrez

References 

Gutierrez family
Show business families of the Philippines